The 1934 Harvard Crimson football team was an American football team that represented Harvard University as an independent during the 1934 college football season. In its fourth and final season under head coach Eddie Casey, the team compiled a 3–5 record and was outscored opponents by a total of 99 to 84. The team played its home games at Harvard Stadium in Boston.

Schedule

References

Harvard
Harvard Crimson football seasons
Harvard Crimson football
1930s in Boston